Road signs in Latvia ensure that transport vehicles move safely and orderly, as well as to inform the participants of traffic built-in graphic icons. These icons are governed by the Vienna Convention on Road Traffic and Vienna Convention on Road Signs and Signals. The system is covered in Ceļu satiksmes noteikumi and the standards documents LVS 77–1:2016 "Ceļa zīmes. 1. daļa: Ceļa zīmes", LVS 77-2:2016 "Ceļa zīmes. 2. daļa: Uzstādīšanas noteikumi" and LVS 77-3:2016 "Ceļa zīmes. 3. daļa: Tehniskās prasības".

Since Latvia was part of the Soviet Union, Latvia used the Soviet road sign standard before adopting its own road sign standard. After the declaration of independence of Latvia from the Soviet Union in 1990 and its subsequent collapse in 1991, it became necessary to create its own standard for road signs in Latvia. Unlike most post-Soviet states, modern road signs in Latvia look different from those used in neighbouring Russia, Ukraine, Belarus, Lithuania. Latvian road signs use the DIN 1451 typeface.

Warning signs

Priority signs

Prohibitory signs

Mandatory signs

Special regulation signs

Service signs

Direction signs

Additional signs

Traffic signals

References

Latvia